Turkish Wrestling Federation (TGF) is the governing body for wrestling in Turkey. It aims to govern, encourage and develop the sport for all throughout the country.

TGF has been established in 1923, and is headquartered in Ankara. TGF is a member of United World Wrestling (UWW), formerly known as the International Federation of Associated Wrestling Styles (FILA).

The federation organizes the national wrestling events, and European and World championships hosted by Turkey. In addition, the TGF promotes and organizes traditional wrestling styles such as oil wrestling and Karakucak.

International achievements

Olympics

World Championships

European Games

European Championships

Notable wrestlers

Freestyle
Men's

Women's
Yasemin Adar (born 1991), Olympic medalist,twice world, five-times European champion
Elif Jale Yeşilırmak (born 1986), European champion
Evin Demirhan (born 1995), European champion

Greco-Roman style

International organizations in Turkey
1949 European Wrestling Championships, 25 June - 3 July, Istanbul
1956 Wrestling World Cup, 	25–31 May, Istanbul
1957 World Wrestling Championships, June 1–2, Istanbul
1967 European Wrestling Championships, 07 – 10 July, Istanbul
1974 World Wrestling Championships (Freestyle), August 29-September, Istanbul
1977 European Wrestling Championships, 26 – 29 May, Bursa
1989 European Wrestling Championships,(Freestyle) 12 – 14 May, Ankara
1993 European Wrestling Championships, 20-28 August, Istanbul
1994 World Wrestling Championships (Freestyle), August 25–28, Istanbul
1999 World Wrestling Championships (Freestyle), October 7–10, Ankara
2001 European Wrestling Championships (Greco-Romane), 19 - 22 April, Istanbul
2004 European Wrestling Championships (Freestyle), 23 – 25 April, Ankara
2008 World Junior Wrestling Championships, July 29 – August 4, Istanbul
2009 World Junior Wrestling Championships, August 4–9, Ankara
2011 World Wrestling Championships, September 12–18, Istanbul
Wrestling at the 2013 Mediterranean Games, 22-26 June, Mersin
2015 European Juniors Wrestling Championships, 23–28 June, Istanbul
2016 World Wrestling Olympic Qualification Tournament 2, 6–8 May, Istanbul
2018 European U23 Wrestling Championship, 4-10 June, Istanbul
Wrestling at the 2021 Islamic Solidarity Games, 10-13 August, Konya

References

External links
  

Turkey
Federation
Wrestling
Organizations based in Ankara
Sports organizations established in 1923
1923 establishments in Turkey